Yeom Hyo-Seob (Hangul: 염효섭) is a South Korean taekwondo practitioner. He won the gold medal in the bantamweight division (-63 kg) at the 2009 World Taekwondo Championships in Copenhagen, Denmark.

Controversial final
At the 2009 World Championship, Yeom won the very controversial gold medal fight against Reza Naderian of Iran following a highly disputed 4–2 final score. Yeom was trailing 2-1 midway through the second round when the judge gave three points to Yeom for a kick to the face that did not connect. Iran requested a video replay but the referee refused. Then in the third round, with Yeom ahead by a point, the referee accepted team Korea's request for a video replay and took away a point from the Iranian fighter.  
Yeom kept clinching the Iranian opponent using fake attacks until the end of the third round, and even ran out on the mat when 5 seconds are left to the end of the match.  
After the match, many South Korean media criticized about the controversial judgement and Yeom's unsportsmanlike ending.

References

Living people
South Korean male taekwondo practitioners
Year of birth missing (living people)
World Taekwondo Championships medalists
21st-century South Korean people